Derek McAllister Jr. (November 6, 1994 – March 6, 2014), known professionally as Speaker Knockerz, was an American rapper and record producer from Columbia, South Carolina. He is known for his independent tracks which would gain traction on the video-sharing platform YouTube. Some of his biggest tracks include "Dap You Up" and "Lonely". He is described by XXL as a frontrunner in the melodically-driven state of modern rap and has been cited as an influence by numerous rappers.

Early and personal life 
Speaker Knockerz would spend the first years of his life in New York City. His father Derek McAllister Sr. was sentenced to 10 years in prison while the family lived in the city. With his father's imprisonment, Speaker Knockerz's mother made the decision to move to South Carolina in order to avoid an unhealthy environment. It is during his time in South Carolina that the aspiring rapper developed his passion for hip-hop music and its creation. In 2010, his father came back home having completed his sentence. Being a musician himself, Derek McAllister Sr. was able to assist his son with the creation of his first mixtape Flight Delayed.

Career 
At age 13, he started using beat making program Fruity Loops after seeing a video of American rapper Soulja Boy doing the same. Around 2010 and 2011, Speaker Knockerz sold his first instrumental to a Miami rapper for $50 and used the money to buy an affordable pair of speakers. As a producer Speaker Knockerz has produced for rappers Gucci Mane, Young Scooter, French Montana, and Shy Glizzy. In Spring 2012, he began rapping under his current moniker as a means of promotion for his record production. In 2013, he would release two mixtapes: Married to the Money and Finesse Father. He would also release his first music video "Money" produced by his friend Loud Visuals. In September 2013, he released the music video to his track "Rico Story Part 1". In December 2013, he released his track "Lonely" alongside an accompanying music video. At the time of his passing, he had 49 tracks available for purchase on iTunes. In May 2014, his family post-humously released the music video for the last song he released during the lifetime "Erica Kane". In September 2014, his mixtape Married to the Money II was posthumously released.

Legacy 
On August 21, 2014, Florida rapper, Kodak Black, released a remix of Speaker Knockerz song "Lonely" called "Off A 14". In a 2016 unreleased song by American rapper Lil Uzi Vert titled "Alone Time", the rapper paid tribute to Speaker Knockerz. In February 2016, American rapper Denzel Curry paid tribute to Speaker Knockerz in his song "Knotty Head". In an August 2018 interview with XXL American rapper Lil Mosey revealed that Speaker Knockerz set the groundwork for his production style. During a November 2018 interview with The Fader, American rapper Roddy Ricch called Speaker Knockerz one of his biggest inspirations musically. In November 2019, American rapper Kevin Gates released his song "By My Lonely", which samples Speaker Knockerz's song "Lonely" as an homage to the late rapper. The song peaked at number 86 on the Billboard Hot 100. In February 2022, Los Angeles rapper OhGeesy released a song titled "Appetizer" in which he pays tribute to Speaker Knockerz in the second verse when he says, "Speaker Knockerz, I'm bumping Erica Kane". In November 2022, rapper Tee Grizzley called Speaker Knockerz's song "RICO Story" one of his favorite storytelling rap songs.

Musical style 
Writing for Complex, David Drake describes Speaker Knockerz style in the following manner: "Enraptured by the sounds of the recent wave of Chicago artists, the Speaker Knockerz sound had a melodic, carefully-crafted feel. While there was something of a street edge to his approach, relative to influences like Lil Durk, there was an optimism and naivete to the Speaker Knockerz sound. He was a bedroom auteur, not a gangster. He shed the hardened shell of drill's aesthetic, focusing his energies on two contrasting moods: a bubbly, euphoric enthusiasm, and a deep, aching melancholy."

Death  
On March 6, 2014, Speaker Knockerz was found dead in his garage in his South Carolina home.

Speaker Knockerz was filed missing on March 5, 2014, after not showing up to studio sessions, meetings, and not responding to phone calls.

In a 2023 interview on Drea O Show, Speaker Knockerz’ mother, Mesha Wilson, confirmed that the late rapper did not die from a heart attack, nor drugs, which fans recently had rumored. 

Speaker Knockerz’ mother also stated that weeks prior to his death, he had been upset and crying over his girlfriend cheating, and reporting him to the police after he allegedly stole her phone during an argument.

Mesha Wilson said that family members blamed his girlfriend for his death, and mental health issues.

As of 2023 Speaker Knockerz’ family have not yet revealed the official cause of death, but have denied rumors of drugs, and natural causes.

References

External links 
 

American male rappers
21st-century American rappers
People from South Carolina
Rappers from South Carolina
1994 births
2014 deaths